James Carter (born May 7, 1978) is an American athlete who competed in the 400 m hurdles. His personal best of 47.43 was set when winning the silver medal at the 2005 World Championships. As of 2017, he is the 15th fastest-ever in the world and 9th fastest-ever in the USA. A 3-time United States champion (2002, 2004, 2007), he won the 2002 IAAF World Cup tile and finished fourth in the Olympic finals in 2000 and 2004.

Early life

Born in Baltimore, Maryland, Carter grew up competing in track & field on the age group level. At the age of 12 he was diagnosed with a rare neuromuscular disease called Myasthenia Gravis which left him unable to run, walk and sometimes chew his food. He soon had surgery to have a tumor removed from his chest and was able to return to the sport of track and field. In high school he attended Mergenthaler Vocational-Technical High School (commonly referred to as Mervo) where he won multiple state championships while competing in sprints, hurdles, jumps and relays. He received All-Metro performer of the year honors and was named Gatorade athlete of the year in the state of Maryland his junior and senior years of high school. He went on to attend Hampton University where he became a 2 time national all-American in the 400 hurdles placing 7th at the NCAA national championships in 1998 and 3rd in 1999. He also currently holds the school indoor record in the Triple Jump and Mid-Eastern Athletic Conference records for most points scored in the conference meet. (38 points indoor and 39.5 outdoor)

Personal life
Son of James Sr. and Marilyn Knight. Carter has two children; Daughter name Taleya and son name Tamere. Currently resides in New Jersey. He coaches in North Carolina, where he coaches and mentors young kids in the sport of track and field. He has helped numerous athletes become national All-Americans on the age group, high school and collegiate level.

Achievements 
2007 World Championships - fourth place
2007 USA Champion
2005 World Championships - silver medal
2004 IAAF World Athletics Final - second place
2004 Olympic Games - fourth place
2004 USA Champion
2002 IAAF World Cup- first place
2002 USA Champion
2002 IAAF Grand Prix Final - third place
2000 Olympic Games - fourth place

Personal bests

External links

James Carter's USATF bio

1978 births
Living people
American male hurdlers
African-American male track and field athletes
Olympic track and field athletes of the United States
Athletes (track and field) at the 2000 Summer Olympics
Athletes (track and field) at the 2004 Summer Olympics
World Athletics Championships medalists
World Athletics Championships athletes for the United States
Track and field athletes from Baltimore
21st-century African-American sportspeople
20th-century African-American sportspeople